The Church of Jesus Christ of Latter-day Saints in Iowa refers to the Church of Jesus Christ of Latter-day Saints (LDS Church) and its members in Iowa. The official church membership as a percentage of general population was 0.87% in 2014. According to the 2014 Pew Forum on Religion & Public Life survey, less than 1% of Iowans self-identify themselves most closely with the Church of Jesus Christ of Latter-day Saints. The LDS Church is the 13th largest denomination in Iowa.

History

A brief history can be found at LDS Newsroom (Iowa) or Deseret News 2010 Church Almanac (Iowa).

Stakes

As of February 2023, the following stakes had congregations located in Iowa:

Mission
 Iowa Iowa City Mission

Temples
Iowa is located within the Nauvoo Illinois Temple and Winter Quarters Nebraska Temple districts.

See also

The Church of Jesus Christ of Latter-day Saints membership statistics (United States)
Religion in Iowa

References

External links
 Newsroom (Iowa)
 ComeUntoChrist.org Latter-day Saints visitor site
 The Church of Jesus Christ of Latter-day Saints official site

Latter Day Saint movement in Iowa
Iowa